The Proletarian Revolution and the Renegade Kautsky (most frequently published as The Dictatorship of the Proletariat and the Renegade Kautsky) is a work by Vladimir Lenin written in October and November 1918 defending the Bolsheviks against criticisms being made against them by Karl Kautsky who was then the intellectual leader of the Second International.

Spurred by Kautsky's 1918 pamphlet The Dictatorship of the Proletariat, Lenin's pamphlet was part of an ongoing polemic between various Bolshevik leaders and the social democrat Kautsky about the role of democracy and force in the transition to socialism.

History

In The Proletarian Revolution and the Renegade Kautsky, V. I. Lenin writes that Kautsky, in his 1918 pamphlet The Dictatorship of the Proletariat, distorted Karl Marx's and Friedrich Engels' ideas on democracy and its relation to socialism and revolution. He also writes that Kautsky uses "twaddle...to befog and confuse the issue", for example when talking about democracy under capitalism, instead of using the term "bourgeois democracy", a term which has clear class content, Kautsky instead uses the term "presocialist democracy."

An important issue taken up by Kautsky in his pamphlet was the dispersal of the Russian Constituent Assembly by the Bolsheviks. Lenin writes that it is the "crux" of the pamphlet and that it is an important question because "the relation between bourgeois democracy and proletarian democracy here confronted the revolution in a practical form." Lenin goes on to assert that Kautsky in his pamphlet resorts to lying and falsification of facts in order to try to argue his point. Lenin continues that important, fundamental issues, especially for someone claiming to be a Marxist, received no attention from Kautsky and that he "evaded" them. One issue was whether "the bourgeois-democratic parliamentary republic is inferior to the republic of the Paris Commune or Soviet type". Essentially, whether or not socialism is a higher form of democracy than bourgeois democracy.

See also

 Terrorism and Communism

References

See also 

 Vladimir Lenin bibliography

External links 

 Karl Kautsky, The Dictatorship of the Proletariat (1918). H.J. Stenning, trans. London: National Labour Press, n.d. [c. 1925].
 The Proletarian Revolution and the Renegade Kautsky by Vladimir Lenin at the Marxists Internet Archive
 A Soviet study guide to the text

Works by Vladimir Lenin
1918 non-fiction books
Historical materialism
Karl Kautsky